St Margarets railway station may be a reference to:

St Margarets railway station (Hertfordshire) 
St Margarets railway station (London)